Holte School is a mixed secondary school and sixth form located in the Lozells area of Birmingham, in the West Midlands of England.

It is a non-selective community school administered by Birmingham City Council. Holte School offers GCSEs and BTECs as programmes of study for pupils, while students in the sixth form have the option to study from a range of A-levels and further BTECs.

References

External links
 

Secondary schools in Birmingham, West Midlands
Community schools in Birmingham, West Midlands